Jean de Pourtales (born 19 August 1965) is a French racing driver from  Neuilly-sur-Seine.
Before his motorsport career, de Pourtales was a member of the British junior alpine ski team, and attended the junior world ski championships. However, an accident unfortunately cut short his skiing career.
De Pourtales began his career in British Formula Vauxhall Junior in 1995 and moved to British Formula Renault in 1998 and finished 10th. He competed in Euro Formula 3000 part-time in 1999 and from 2001 to 2004 with his best season finish being 17th in 2003. Since then he has participated part-time in the Le Mans Series LMP2 class and the 24 Hours of Le Mans for Kruse Schiller Motorsport.

Handicap
Jean de Pourtales is a rarity in motorsport, as he competes with an artificial limb. A road accident in his twenties resulted in the loss of his left hand and forearm and has since raced with a special steering wheel that attaches to a prosthetic arm enabling him to compete just like his rivals.

24 Hours of Le Mans results

References

External links
Jean de Pourtales profile at Speed Sport Magazine
Jean de Pourtales at Driver Database
Jean de Pourtales Le Mans Series driver profile

1965 births
Living people
French racing drivers
24 Hours of Le Mans drivers
Formula Renault Eurocup drivers
British Formula Renault 2.0 drivers
Italian Formula Renault 2.0 drivers
Auto GP drivers
European Le Mans Series drivers
Sportspeople from Neuilly-sur-Seine
Pourtalès family

JD Motorsport drivers